St Andrews railway station was the second station to built in the town of St Andrews, Fife, Scotland. The station, which was in service from 1887 to 1969, was built by the St Andrews Railway and the Anstruther and St Andrews Railway.

History 
The station opened on 1 June 1887 by the North British Railway replacing the first station (which became a goods yard and depot). Although built to a two-track standard, the railway only had one line. The station, which was built within a stone-walled cutting on the edge of the town, had a side and an island platforms on either side of the single track and a side bay with a siding in place of a second through line. Rail traffic was controlled by a signal box on the west side of the stone cutting. 

In 1965, the line south of the town, which had been the Anstruther and St Andrews Railway, was closed making St Andrews the terminus of the line for services from Leuchars railway station on the Edinburgh–Dundee line. The signal box closed in 1967. The station, along with the entire line, closed on 6 January 1969. The site, which has retained the walls of the stone cutting,  is now used for onroad parking.

References 

Disused railway stations in Fife
Railway stations in Great Britain opened in 1887
Railway stations in Great Britain closed in 1969
Former North British Railway stations
1887 establishments in Scotland
1969 disestablishments in Scotland